Vladimir Smorchkov (born January 25, 1980) is a Russian weightlifter, and former World Champion competing in the 105 kg category.

Career
At the 2001 World Weightlifting Championships he exceeded the world standard in the snatch and set a new World Record of 198 kg. His lead was so large after the snatch portion, that even after finishing fourth in the clean and jerk he still won the gold medal in the total.

In 2002 at the World Championships he competed in the B group, after snatching 197.5 kg (which would be the gold medal snatch by 5 kg) he placed tenth in the clean and jerk with 220.0 kg. Similar to 2001, his snatch lead was so large that he still received a bronze medal in the total.

In 2006 he was banned for two years for failing a doping test.

Major results

References

External links
the-sports.org

1980 births
Living people
World Weightlifting Championships medalists
Russian male weightlifters
European Weightlifting Championships medalists
20th-century Russian people
21st-century Russian people